Hyun-tae, also spelled Hyeon-tae, is a Korean masculine given name. Its meaning depends on the hanja used to write each syllable of the name. There are 35 hanja with the reading "hyun" and 20 hanja with the reading "tae" on the South Korean government's official list of hanja which may be registered for use in given names.

People with this name include:
Kim Hyun-tae (born 1961), South Korean football coach and former player
Choi Hyun-tae (born 1987), South Korean football player
Kim Hyeon-tae (born 1990), South Korean alpine ski racer
Lee Hyun-tae, South Korean sport shooter, gold medalist in Shooting at the 2010 Asian Games – Men's 50 metre rifle three positions team

Fictional characters with this name include:
Kim Hyun-tae, in 2000 South Korean film Libera Me
Shin Hyun-tae, in 2005 South Korean television series Green Rose
Kim Hyeon-tae, in 2008 South Korean film Eye for an Eye
Kang Hyun-tae, in 2009 South Korean television series Triple
Park Hyun-tae, in 2013 South Korean television series Pots of Gold
Hyun-tae, in 2014 South Korean film Confession
Kim Hyun-tae, in 2015 South Korean television series Spy
Kim Hyeon-tae, in 2016 South Korean television series My Son-in-Law's Woman

See also
List of Korean given names

References

Korean masculine given names